Ryton Wood Meadows is a reserve near Coventry in the county of Warwickshire, England. Butterfly Conservation owns and manages this reserve. It is 31 acres.

References

Butterfly Conservation reserves
Meadows in the West Midlands